Élton Martins da Cruz (born 4 November 1988), or simply Élton, is a Brazilian footballer who plays as a midfielder for East Riffa Club.

Career 
Born in Belo Horizonte, Minas Gerais, Élton played in the youth teams of América (MG) and Atlético Mineiro before joining Corinthians in 2007.  While with Corinthians, he would spend most of the time on loan.  He was loaned to Profute, before making his first move abroad, to Serbia, as he was loaned on February 5, 2009, to FK Teleoptik.  He made 8 appearances and scored 2 goals during the second half of the 2008–09 Serbian League Belgrade season. Playing along compatriots Washington Santana da Silva, Alex dos Santos Gonçalves and Jefferson Madeira, they helped Teleoptik to finish 2nd in the 2008–09 Serbian League Belgrade, one of Serbian 3rd tiers, thus earning promotion to the 2009–10 Serbian First League.

After playing in Serbian second level, he returned to Brazil, however he would be loaned again, this time to Taubaté where he will play in the Série B of the Campeonato Paulista until the end of 2009.

In 2010, he left Corinthians and moved to Spain, where after playing one season with Antequera CF and another with CD Puertollano, he joined in summer 2012 RCD Espanyol B. Next he spent a season playing in Iraq with Zakho FC.

In early summer, 2014, he started practicing with Independiente Medellín of Colombian
Liga Postobón, and the Managerof the club, Hernán Torres,  said he was impressed with his skills. He would be the 6th new player for the club for the Liga Postobón 2014-II season starting in late summer, 2014.

References

External sources 
 

Living people
1988 births
Footballers from Belo Horizonte
Brazilian footballers
Brazilian expatriate footballers
Association football midfielders
Segunda División B players
Tercera División players
Campeonato Brasileiro Série B players
Campeonato Brasileiro Série C players
Categoría Primera A players
Bahraini Premier League players
Sport Club Corinthians Paulista players
Esporte Clube Taubaté players
FK Teleoptik players
Antequera CF footballers
CD Puertollano footballers
RCD Espanyol B footballers
Mérida AD players
Zakho FC players
Independiente Medellín footballers
Patriotas Boyacá footballers
Batatais Futebol Clube players
Londrina Esporte Clube players
Cuiabá Esporte Clube players
Concórdia Atlético Clube players
Clube Atlético Juventus players
Rio Claro Futebol Clube players
East Riffa Club players
Expatriate footballers in Spain
Expatriate footballers in Iraq
Expatriate footballers in Colombia
Expatriate footballers in Serbia
Expatriate footballers in Bahrain
Brazilian expatriate sportspeople in Spain
Brazilian expatriate sportspeople in Iraq
Brazilian expatriate sportspeople in Colombia
Brazilian expatriate sportspeople in Serbia
Brazilian expatriate sportspeople in Bahrain